Ruxanda Glavan (born 5 April 1980) is a Moldovan politician, who since 30 July 2015 until 25 July 2017 served as Minister of Health of Moldova. Previously, since 18 February 2015 until 30 July 2015 she served as Minister of Labour, Social Protection and Family of Moldova. Between 2013-2015 Ruxanda Glavan was Deputy Minister of Labour, Social Protection and Family.

On 1 May 2020, Glavan joined the parliamentary group Pro Moldova, which became a political party on 22 June.

References

1980 births
Living people
Democratic Party of Moldova politicians
Government ministers of Moldova
Moldovan physicians
Women government ministers of Moldova
Moldovan Ministers of Health
Physicians from Chișinău
21st-century Moldovan women politicians